Willem Jakobus Smit (born 29 December 1992 in Lydenburg) is a South African cyclist, who currently rides for UCI Continental team . In August 2019, he was named in the startlist for the 2019 Vuelta a España.

Major results

2013
 1st  Time trial, African Under–23 Road Championships
 2nd Time trial, African Road Championships
2015
 5th Time trial, African Road Championships
2017
 African Road Championships
1st  Road race
4th Time trial
 1st  Overall Tour Meles Zenawi
1st  Points classification
1st Stage 5
1st  Overall Vuelta Ciclista a León
 National Road Championships
3rd Road race
3rd Time trial
2018
 8th Vuelta a Murcia
2020
  Combativity award Stage 3 Vuelta a España
2021
 National Road Championships
2nd Road race
4th Time trial
 10th Trofeo Calvia
2022
 National Road Championships
2nd Road race
4th Time trial
2023
 1st Alanya CUP

Grand Tour general classification results timeline

References

External links

1992 births
Living people
South African male cyclists
People from Lydenburg
White South African people